Holtze is a locality of Darwin, Northern Territory, Australia. It is 22 km southeast of the Darwin CBD. Its local government area is the Municipality of Litchfield. The locality is mostly a rural area, just north Palmerston. It may have been named for Maurice William Holtze (1840–1923), the botanist who established Darwin's Botanical Gardens, or his son Nicholas, who succeeded him as curator.

In September 2010, the Northern Territory Government announced that new Darwin’s prison precinct, Doug Owston Correctional Centre, would be built in Holtze about four kilometres north of Howard Springs Road. In July 2012, a road in Holtze was registered and named after prison officer, Reginald Anthony Willard (1943–1997), who worked at the correctional centre.

In 2011, the Northern Territory Government identified a greenfield site in Holtze near the intersection of Temple Terrace and the Stuart Highway as the location for the Palmerston Regional Hospital. The hospital opened in 2018.

Population
In the 2016 Census, there were 1,810 people in Holtze. Aboriginal and Torres Strait Islander people made up 44.4% of the population.

See also
Robertson Barracks

References

Suburbs of Darwin, Northern Territory